The 1983 NCAA Division I-AA football season, part of college football in the United States organized by the National Collegiate Athletic Association at the Division I-AA level, began in August 1983, and concluded with the 1983 NCAA Division I-AA Football Championship Game on December 17, 1983, at Johnson Hagood Stadium in Charleston, South Carolina.

Conference changes and new programs

Conference standings

Conference champions

Postseason
The top four teams were seeded, and received first-round byes.

NCAA Division I-AA playoff bracket

* indicates overtime period

References